The Lepidoptera of Luxembourg consist of both the butterflies and moths recorded from Luxembourg.

Butterflies

Hesperiidae
Carcharodus alceae (Esper, 1780)
Carterocephalus palaemon (Pallas, 1771)
Erynnis tages (Linnaeus, 1758)
Hesperia comma (Linnaeus, 1758)
Heteropterus morpheus (Pallas, 1771)
Ochlodes sylvanus (Esper, 1777)
Pyrgus alveus (Hübner, 1803)
Pyrgus carthami (Hübner, 1813)
Pyrgus malvae (Linnaeus, 1758)
Pyrgus serratulae (Rambur, 1839)
Spialia sertorius (Hoffmannsegg, 1804)
Thymelicus acteon (Rottemburg, 1775)
Thymelicus lineola (Ochsenheimer, 1808)
Thymelicus sylvestris (Poda, 1761)

Nymphalidae
Aglais io (Linnaeus, 1758)
Aglais urticae (Linnaeus, 1758)
Apatura ilia (Denis & Schiffermüller, 1775)
Apatura iris (Linnaeus, 1758)
Aphantopus hyperantus (Linnaeus, 1758)
Araschnia levana (Linnaeus, 1758)
Argynnis paphia (Linnaeus, 1758)
Boloria dia (Linnaeus, 1767)
Boloria euphrosyne (Linnaeus, 1758)
Boloria selene (Denis & Schiffermüller, 1775)
Brenthis ino (Rottemburg, 1775)
Brintesia circe (Fabricius, 1775)
Chazara briseis (Linnaeus, 1764)
Coenonympha arcania (Linnaeus, 1761)
Coenonympha glycerion (Borkhausen, 1788)
Coenonympha hero (Linnaeus, 1761)
Coenonympha oedippus (Fabricius, 1787)
Coenonympha pamphilus (Linnaeus, 1758)
Coenonympha tullia (Muller, 1764)
Erebia aethiops (Esper, 1777)
Erebia medusa (Denis & Schiffermüller, 1775)
Euphydryas aurinia (Rottemburg, 1775)
Euphydryas maturna (Linnaeus, 1758)
Fabriciana adippe (Denis & Schiffermüller, 1775)
Fabriciana niobe (Linnaeus, 1758)
Hipparchia fagi (Scopoli, 1763)
Hipparchia hermione (Linnaeus, 1764)
Hipparchia semele (Linnaeus, 1758)
Issoria lathonia (Linnaeus, 1758)
Lasiommata maera (Linnaeus, 1758)
Lasiommata megera (Linnaeus, 1767)
Limenitis camilla (Linnaeus, 1764)
Limenitis populi (Linnaeus, 1758)
Lopinga achine (Scopoli, 1763)
Maniola jurtina (Linnaeus, 1758)
Melanargia galathea (Linnaeus, 1758)
Melitaea athalia (Rottemburg, 1775)
Melitaea aurelia Nickerl, 1850
Melitaea cinxia (Linnaeus, 1758)
Melitaea diamina (Lang, 1789)
Melitaea didyma (Esper, 1778)
Melitaea parthenoides Keferstein, 1851
Melitaea phoebe (Denis & Schiffermüller, 1775)
Minois dryas (Scopoli, 1763)
Neptis rivularis (Scopoli, 1763)
Nymphalis antiopa (Linnaeus, 1758)
Nymphalis polychloros (Linnaeus, 1758)
Pararge aegeria (Linnaeus, 1758)
Polygonia c-album (Linnaeus, 1758)
Pyronia tithonus (Linnaeus, 1767)
Speyeria aglaja (Linnaeus, 1758)
Vanessa atalanta (Linnaeus, 1758)
Vanessa cardui (Linnaeus, 1758)

Papilionidae
Iphiclides podalirius (Linnaeus, 1758)
Papilio machaon Linnaeus, 1758

Pieridae
Anthocharis cardamines (Linnaeus, 1758)
Aporia crataegi (Linnaeus, 1758)
Colias alfacariensis Ribbe, 1905
Colias croceus (Fourcroy, 1785)
Colias hyale (Linnaeus, 1758)
Gonepteryx rhamni (Linnaeus, 1758)
Leptidea sinapis (Linnaeus, 1758)
Pieris brassicae (Linnaeus, 1758)
Pieris napi (Linnaeus, 1758)
Pieris rapae (Linnaeus, 1758)

Lycaenidae
Aricia agestis (Denis & Schiffermüller, 1775)
Callophrys rubi (Linnaeus, 1758)
Celastrina argiolus (Linnaeus, 1758)
Cupido minimus (Fuessly, 1775)
Cupido argiades (Pallas, 1771)
Cyaniris semiargus (Rottemburg, 1775)
Favonius quercus (Linnaeus, 1758)
Glaucopsyche alexis (Poda, 1761)
Lycaena helle (Denis & Schiffermüller, 1775)
Lycaena hippothoe (Linnaeus, 1761)
Lycaena phlaeas (Linnaeus, 1761)
Lysandra bellargus (Rottemburg, 1775)
Lysandra coridon (Poda, 1761)
Phengaris alcon (Denis & Schiffermüller, 1775)
Phengaris arion (Linnaeus, 1758)
Phengaris nausithous (Bergstrasser, 1779)
Phengaris teleius (Bergstrasser, 1779)
Plebejus argus (Linnaeus, 1758)
Plebejus idas (Linnaeus, 1761)
Polyommatus damon (Denis & Schiffermüller, 1775)
Polyommatus dorylas (Denis & Schiffermüller, 1775)
Polyommatus icarus (Rottemburg, 1775)
Polyommatus thersites (Cantener, 1835)
Pseudophilotes baton (Bergstrasser, 1779)
Satyrium acaciae (Fabricius, 1787)
Satyrium ilicis (Esper, 1779)
Satyrium pruni (Linnaeus, 1758)
Satyrium spini (Denis & Schiffermüller, 1775)
Satyrium w-album (Knoch, 1782)
Thecla betulae (Linnaeus, 1758)

Riodinidae
Hamearis lucina (Linnaeus, 1758)

Moths

Adelidae
Adela reaumurella (Linnaeus, 1758)
Adela violella (Denis & Schiffermüller, 1775)
Nematopogon adansoniella (Villers, 1789)
Nematopogon pilella (Denis & Schiffermüller, 1775)
Nematopogon swammerdamella (Linnaeus, 1758)
Nemophora cupriacella (Hübner, 1819)
Nemophora degeerella (Linnaeus, 1758)
Nemophora metallica (Poda, 1761)
Nemophora violellus (Herrich-Schäffer in Stainton, 1851)

Alucitidae
Alucita grammodactyla Zeller, 1841

Argyresthiidae
Argyresthia abdominalis Zeller, 1839
Argyresthia albistria (Haworth, 1828)
Argyresthia bonnetella (Linnaeus, 1758)
Argyresthia brockeella (Hübner, 1813)
Argyresthia conjugella Zeller, 1839
Argyresthia curvella (Linnaeus, 1761)
Argyresthia goedartella (Linnaeus, 1758)
Argyresthia pruniella (Clerck, 1759)
Argyresthia pygmaeella (Denis & Schiffermüller, 1775)
Argyresthia retinella Zeller, 1839
Argyresthia spinosella Stainton, 1849
Argyresthia bergiella (Ratzeburg, 1840)
Argyresthia dilectella Zeller, 1847

Autostichidae
Oegoconia quadripuncta (Haworth, 1828)

Bedelliidae
Bedellia somnulentella (Zeller, 1847)

Brahmaeidae
Lemonia dumi (Linnaeus, 1761)

Bucculatricidae
Bucculatrix albedinella (Zeller, 1839)
Bucculatrix bechsteinella (Bechstein & Scharfenberg, 1805)
Bucculatrix nigricomella (Zeller, 1839)
Bucculatrix ulmella Zeller, 1848

Chimabachidae
Dasystoma salicella (Hübner, 1796)
Diurnea fagella (Denis & Schiffermüller, 1775)
Diurnea lipsiella (Denis & Schiffermüller, 1775)

Choreutidae
Anthophila fabriciana (Linnaeus, 1767)
Choreutis pariana (Clerck, 1759)
Prochoreutis myllerana (Fabricius, 1794)

Coleophoridae
Coleophora albidella (Denis & Schiffermüller, 1775)
Coleophora alcyonipennella (Kollar, 1832)
Coleophora alticolella Zeller, 1849
Coleophora caespititiella Zeller, 1839
Coleophora calycotomella Stainton, 1869
Coleophora clypeiferella Hofmann, 1871
Coleophora currucipennella Zeller, 1839
Coleophora deauratella Lienig & Zeller, 1846
Coleophora discordella Zeller, 1849
Coleophora flavipennella (Duponchel, 1843)
Coleophora frischella (Linnaeus, 1758)
Coleophora glaucicolella Wood, 1892
Coleophora gryphipennella (Hübner, 1796)
Coleophora hemerobiella (Scopoli, 1763)
Coleophora ibipennella Zeller, 1849
Coleophora lixella Zeller, 1849
Coleophora nutantella Muhlig & Frey, 1857
Coleophora otidipennella (Hübner, 1817)
Coleophora pennella (Denis & Schiffermüller, 1775)
Coleophora serratella (Linnaeus, 1761)
Coleophora solitariella Zeller, 1849
Coleophora striatipennella Nylander in Tengstrom, 1848
Coleophora sylvaticella Wood, 1892
Coleophora tauricella Staudinger, 1880
Coleophora trifolii (Curtis, 1832)
Coleophora trigeminella Fuchs, 1881
Coleophora vibicella (Hübner, 1813)
Coleophora vulnerariae Zeller, 1839
Metriotes lutarea (Haworth, 1828)

Cosmopterigidae
Pancalia leuwenhoekella (Linnaeus, 1761)

Cossidae
Cossus cossus (Linnaeus, 1758)
Zeuzera pyrina (Linnaeus, 1761)

Crambidae
Acentria ephemerella (Denis & Schiffermüller, 1775)
Agriphila geniculea (Haworth, 1811)
Agriphila inquinatella (Denis & Schiffermüller, 1775)
Agriphila selasella (Hübner, 1813)
Agriphila straminella (Denis & Schiffermüller, 1775)
Agriphila tristella (Denis & Schiffermüller, 1775)
Agrotera nemoralis (Scopoli, 1763)
Anania coronata (Hufnagel, 1767)
Anania crocealis (Hübner, 1796)
Anania funebris (Strom, 1768)
Anania fuscalis (Denis & Schiffermüller, 1775)
Anania hortulata (Linnaeus, 1758)
Anania lancealis (Denis & Schiffermüller, 1775)
Anania perlucidalis (Hübner, 1809)
Anania stachydalis (Germar, 1821)
Anania verbascalis (Denis & Schiffermüller, 1775)
Atralata albofascialis (Treitschke, 1829)
Calamotropha paludella (Hübner, 1824)
Cataclysta lemnata (Linnaeus, 1758)
Catoptria falsella (Denis & Schiffermüller, 1775)
Catoptria margaritella (Denis & Schiffermüller, 1775)
Catoptria myella (Hübner, 1796)
Catoptria mytilella (Hübner, 1805)
Catoptria permutatellus (Herrich-Schäffer, 1848)
Catoptria pinella (Linnaeus, 1758)
Catoptria verellus (Zincken, 1817)
Chilo phragmitella (Hübner, 1805)
Chrysoteuchia culmella (Linnaeus, 1758)
Crambus ericella (Hübner, 1813)
Crambus hamella (Thunberg, 1788)
Crambus lathoniellus (Zincken, 1817)
Crambus pascuella (Linnaeus, 1758)
Crambus perlella (Scopoli, 1763)
Crambus pratella (Linnaeus, 1758)
Cynaeda dentalis (Denis & Schiffermüller, 1775)
Donacaula forficella (Thunberg, 1794)
Elophila nymphaeata (Linnaeus, 1758)
Epascestria pustulalis (Hübner, 1823)
Eudonia delunella (Stainton, 1849)
Eudonia lacustrata (Panzer, 1804)
Eudonia laetella (Zeller, 1846)
Eudonia mercurella (Linnaeus, 1758)
Eudonia pallida (Curtis, 1827)
Eudonia truncicolella (Stainton, 1849)
Eurrhypis pollinalis (Denis & Schiffermüller, 1775)
Evergestis extimalis (Scopoli, 1763)
Evergestis forficalis (Linnaeus, 1758)
Evergestis limbata (Linnaeus, 1767)
Evergestis pallidata (Hufnagel, 1767)
Heliothela wulfeniana (Scopoli, 1763)
Hellula undalis (Fabricius, 1781)
Loxostege sticticalis (Linnaeus, 1761)
Mecyna flavalis (Denis & Schiffermüller, 1775)
Mecyna lutealis (Duponchel, 1833)
Nomophila noctuella (Denis & Schiffermüller, 1775)
Nymphula nitidulata (Hufnagel, 1767)
Ostrinia nubilalis (Hübner, 1796)
Paracorsia repandalis (Denis & Schiffermüller, 1775)
Paratalanta hyalinalis (Hübner, 1796)
Pediasia luteella (Denis & Schiffermüller, 1775)
Platytes alpinella (Hübner, 1813)
Pleuroptya ruralis (Scopoli, 1763)
Psammotis pulveralis (Hübner, 1796)
Pyrausta aurata (Scopoli, 1763)
Pyrausta cingulata (Linnaeus, 1758)
Pyrausta despicata (Scopoli, 1763)
Pyrausta nigrata (Scopoli, 1763)
Pyrausta purpuralis (Linnaeus, 1758)
Pyrausta sanguinalis (Linnaeus, 1767)
Scoparia ambigualis (Treitschke, 1829)
Scoparia basistrigalis Knaggs, 1866
Scoparia pyralella (Denis & Schiffermüller, 1775)
Scoparia subfusca Haworth, 1811
Sitochroa palealis (Denis & Schiffermüller, 1775)
Sitochroa verticalis (Linnaeus, 1758)
Thisanotia chrysonuchella (Scopoli, 1763)
Udea elutalis (Denis & Schiffermüller, 1775)
Udea ferrugalis (Hübner, 1796)
Udea hamalis (Thunberg, 1788)
Udea lutealis (Hübner, 1809)
Udea olivalis (Denis & Schiffermüller, 1775)
Udea prunalis (Denis & Schiffermüller, 1775)

Drepanidae
Achlya flavicornis (Linnaeus, 1758)
Cilix glaucata (Scopoli, 1763)
Cymatophorina diluta (Denis & Schiffermüller, 1775)
Drepana curvatula (Borkhausen, 1790)
Drepana falcataria (Linnaeus, 1758)
Falcaria lacertinaria (Linnaeus, 1758)
Habrosyne pyritoides (Hufnagel, 1766)
Ochropacha duplaris (Linnaeus, 1761)
Polyploca ridens (Fabricius, 1787)
Sabra harpagula (Esper, 1786)
Tethea ocularis (Linnaeus, 1767)
Tethea or (Denis & Schiffermüller, 1775)
Tetheella fluctuosa (Hübner, 1803)
Thyatira batis (Linnaeus, 1758)
Watsonalla binaria (Hufnagel, 1767)
Watsonalla cultraria (Fabricius, 1775)

Elachistidae
Agonopterix alstromeriana (Clerck, 1759)
Agonopterix angelicella (Hübner, 1813)
Agonopterix arenella (Denis & Schiffermüller, 1775)
Agonopterix assimilella (Treitschke, 1832)
Agonopterix ciliella (Stainton, 1849)
Agonopterix heracliana (Linnaeus, 1758)
Agonopterix kaekeritziana (Linnaeus, 1767)
Agonopterix laterella (Denis & Schiffermüller, 1775)
Agonopterix liturosa (Haworth, 1811)
Agonopterix nervosa (Haworth, 1811)
Agonopterix ocellana (Fabricius, 1775)
Agonopterix parilella (Treitschke, 1835)
Agonopterix purpurea (Haworth, 1811)
Agonopterix scopariella (Heinemann, 1870)
Anchinia cristalis (Scopoli, 1763)
Chrysoclista lathamella (T. B. Fletcher, 1936)
Chrysoclista linneella (Clerck, 1759)
Depressaria albipunctella (Denis & Schiffermüller, 1775)
Depressaria artemisiae Nickerl, 1864
Depressaria chaerophylli Zeller, 1839
Depressaria libanotidella Schlager, 1849
Depressaria olerella Zeller, 1854
Depressaria radiella (Goeze, 1783)
Elachista argentella (Clerck, 1759)
Elachista pollinariella Zeller, 1839
Elachista pollutella Duponchel, 1843
Elachista pullicomella Zeller, 1839
Elachista subocellea (Stephens, 1834)
Elachista unifasciella (Haworth, 1828)
Elachista albifrontella (Hübner, 1817)
Elachista atricomella Stainton, 1849
Elachista bifasciella Treitschke, 1833
Elachista canapennella (Hübner, 1813)
Elachista lastrella Chretien, 1896
Elachista maculicerusella (Bruand, 1859)
Ethmia bipunctella (Fabricius, 1775)
Ethmia dodecea (Haworth, 1828)
Ethmia quadrillella (Goeze, 1783)
Ethmia terminella T. B. Fletcher, 1938
Luquetia lobella (Denis & Schiffermüller, 1775)
Orophia sordidella (Hübner, 1796)
Semioscopis avellanella (Hübner, 1793)
Semioscopis oculella (Thunberg, 1794)
Semioscopis steinkellneriana (Denis & Schiffermüller, 1775)

Endromidae
Endromis versicolora (Linnaeus, 1758)

Erebidae
Amata phegea (Linnaeus, 1758)
Arctia caja (Linnaeus, 1758)
Arctia festiva (Hufnagel, 1766)
Arctia villica (Linnaeus, 1758)
Arctornis l-nigrum (Muller, 1764)
Atolmis rubricollis (Linnaeus, 1758)
Callimorpha dominula (Linnaeus, 1758)
Calliteara pudibunda (Linnaeus, 1758)
Catocala elocata (Esper, 1787)
Catocala fraxini (Linnaeus, 1758)
Catocala fulminea (Scopoli, 1763)
Catocala nupta (Linnaeus, 1767)
Catocala promissa (Denis & Schiffermüller, 1775)
Catocala sponsa (Linnaeus, 1767)
Coscinia cribraria (Linnaeus, 1758)
Coscinia striata (Linnaeus, 1758)
Cybosia mesomella (Linnaeus, 1758)
Diacrisia sannio (Linnaeus, 1758)
Diaphora mendica (Clerck, 1759)
Dicallomera fascelina (Linnaeus, 1758)
Dysauxes ancilla (Linnaeus, 1767)
Dysauxes punctata (Fabricius, 1781)
Eilema complana (Linnaeus, 1758)
Eilema depressa (Esper, 1787)
Eilema griseola (Hübner, 1803)
Eilema lurideola (Zincken, 1817)
Eilema sororcula (Hufnagel, 1766)
Euclidia mi (Clerck, 1759)
Euclidia glyphica (Linnaeus, 1758)
Euplagia quadripunctaria (Poda, 1761)
Euproctis chrysorrhoea (Linnaeus, 1758)
Euproctis similis (Fuessly, 1775)
Herminia grisealis (Denis & Schiffermüller, 1775)
Herminia tarsicrinalis (Knoch, 1782)
Herminia tarsipennalis (Treitschke, 1835)
Hypena crassalis (Fabricius, 1787)
Hypena lividalis (Hübner, 1796)
Hypena obsitalis (Hübner, 1813)
Hypena proboscidalis (Linnaeus, 1758)
Hypena rostralis (Linnaeus, 1758)
Hyphoraia aulica (Linnaeus, 1758)
Laspeyria flexula (Denis & Schiffermüller, 1775)
Leucoma salicis (Linnaeus, 1758)
Lithosia quadra (Linnaeus, 1758)
Lygephila craccae (Denis & Schiffermüller, 1775)
Lygephila pastinum (Treitschke, 1826)
Lygephila viciae (Hübner, 1822)
Lymantria dispar (Linnaeus, 1758)
Lymantria monacha (Linnaeus, 1758)
Macrochilo cribrumalis (Hübner, 1793)
Miltochrista miniata (Forster, 1771)
Minucia lunaris (Denis & Schiffermüller, 1775)
Nudaria mundana (Linnaeus, 1761)
Orgyia recens (Hübner, 1819)
Orgyia antiqua (Linnaeus, 1758)
Paidia rica (Freyer, 1858)
Parascotia fuliginaria (Linnaeus, 1761)
Parasemia plantaginis (Linnaeus, 1758)
Pechipogo strigilata (Linnaeus, 1758)
Pelosia muscerda (Hufnagel, 1766)
Pericallia matronula (Linnaeus, 1758)
Phragmatobia fuliginosa (Linnaeus, 1758)
Phytometra viridaria (Clerck, 1759)
Polypogon tentacularia (Linnaeus, 1758)
Rhyparia purpurata (Linnaeus, 1758)
Rivula sericealis (Scopoli, 1763)
Schrankia costaestrigalis (Stephens, 1834)
Scoliopteryx libatrix (Linnaeus, 1758)
Setina irrorella (Linnaeus, 1758)
Spilosoma lubricipeda (Linnaeus, 1758)
Spilosoma lutea (Hufnagel, 1766)
Spilosoma urticae (Esper, 1789)
Thumatha senex (Hübner, 1808)
Trisateles emortualis (Denis & Schiffermüller, 1775)
Tyria jacobaeae (Linnaeus, 1758)
Utetheisa pulchella (Linnaeus, 1758)

Eriocraniidae
Dyseriocrania subpurpurella (Haworth, 1828)
Eriocrania semipurpurella (Stephens, 1835)

Gelechiidae
Acompsia cinerella (Clerck, 1759)
Acompsia schmidtiellus (Heyden, 1848)
Anacampsis blattariella (Hübner, 1796)
Anacampsis populella (Clerck, 1759)
Anarsia lineatella Zeller, 1839
Anarsia spartiella (Schrank, 1802)
Apodia bifractella (Duponchel, 1843)
Aproaerema anthyllidella (Hübner, 1813)
Argolamprotes micella (Denis & Schiffermüller, 1775)
Bryotropha affinis (Haworth, 1828)
Bryotropha basaltinella (Zeller, 1839)
Bryotropha desertella (Douglas, 1850)
Bryotropha senectella (Zeller, 1839)
Bryotropha similis (Stainton, 1854)
Bryotropha terrella (Denis & Schiffermüller, 1775)
Carpatolechia proximella (Hübner, 1796)
Chionodes distinctella (Zeller, 1839)
Chrysoesthia drurella (Fabricius, 1775)
Dichomeris alacella (Zeller, 1839)
Dichomeris derasella (Denis & Schiffermüller, 1775)
Dichomeris marginella (Fabricius, 1781)
Eulamprotes atrella (Denis & Schiffermüller, 1775)
Eulamprotes wilkella (Linnaeus, 1758)
Exoteleia dodecella (Linnaeus, 1758)
Gelechia muscosella Zeller, 1839
Gelechia rhombella (Denis & Schiffermüller, 1775)
Gelechia sororculella (Hübner, 1817)
Helcystogramma lutatella (Herrich-Schäffer, 1854)
Helcystogramma rufescens (Haworth, 1828)
Isophrictis anthemidella (Wocke, 1871)
Isophrictis striatella (Denis & Schiffermüller, 1775)
Mesophleps silacella (Hübner, 1796)
Metzneria metzneriella (Stainton, 1851)
Metzneria neuropterella (Zeller, 1839)
Mirificarma interrupta (Curtis, 1827)
Mirificarma lentiginosella (Zeller, 1839)
Mirificarma mulinella (Zeller, 1839)
Monochroa conspersella (Herrich-Schäffer, 1854)
Monochroa tenebrella (Hübner, 1817)
Neofaculta ericetella (Geyer, 1832)
Neofriseria peliella (Treitschke, 1835)
Pexicopia malvella (Hübner, 1805)
Prolita solutella (Zeller, 1839)
Pseudotelphusa scalella (Scopoli, 1763)
Psoricoptera gibbosella (Zeller, 1839)
Recurvaria leucatella (Clerck, 1759)
Recurvaria nanella (Denis & Schiffermüller, 1775)
Scrobipalpa acuminatella (Sircom, 1850)
Scrobipalpa atriplicella (Fischer von Röslerstamm, 1841)
Scrobipalpa obsoletella (Fischer von Röslerstamm, 1841)
Scrobipalpa pauperella (Heinemann, 1870)
Sitotroga cerealella (Olivier, 1789)
Sophronia humerella (Denis & Schiffermüller, 1775)
Sophronia semicostella (Hübner, 1813)
Stenolechia gemmella (Linnaeus, 1758)
Syncopacma coronillella (Treitschke, 1833)
Syncopacma larseniella Gozmany, 1957
Teleiodes luculella (Hübner, 1813)
Teleiodes saltuum (Zeller, 1878)

Geometridae
Abraxas grossulariata (Linnaeus, 1758)
Abraxas sylvata (Scopoli, 1763)
Acasis viretata (Hübner, 1799)
Aethalura punctulata (Denis & Schiffermüller, 1775)
Agriopis aurantiaria (Hübner, 1799)
Agriopis bajaria (Denis & Schiffermüller, 1775)
Agriopis leucophaearia (Denis & Schiffermüller, 1775)
Agriopis marginaria (Fabricius, 1776)
Alcis bastelbergeri (Hirschke, 1908)
Alcis repandata (Linnaeus, 1758)
Aleucis distinctata (Herrich-Schäffer, 1839)
Alsophila aceraria (Denis & Schiffermüller, 1775)
Alsophila aescularia (Denis & Schiffermüller, 1775)
Angerona prunaria (Linnaeus, 1758)
Anticlea derivata (Denis & Schiffermüller, 1775)
Anticollix sparsata (Treitschke, 1828)
Apeira syringaria (Linnaeus, 1758)
Aplasta ononaria (Fuessly, 1783)
Aplocera efformata (Guenee, 1858)
Aplocera plagiata (Linnaeus, 1758)
Aplocera praeformata (Hübner, 1826)
Apocheima hispidaria (Denis & Schiffermüller, 1775)
Archiearis parthenias (Linnaeus, 1761)
Ascotis selenaria (Denis & Schiffermüller, 1775)
Aspitates gilvaria (Denis & Schiffermüller, 1775)
Asthena albulata (Hufnagel, 1767)
Asthena anseraria (Herrich-Schäffer, 1855)
Biston betularia (Linnaeus, 1758)
Biston strataria (Hufnagel, 1767)
Boudinotiana notha (Hübner, 1803)
Bupalus piniaria (Linnaeus, 1758)
Cabera exanthemata (Scopoli, 1763)
Cabera pusaria (Linnaeus, 1758)
Campaea honoraria (Denis & Schiffermüller, 1775)
Campaea margaritaria (Linnaeus, 1761)
Camptogramma bilineata (Linnaeus, 1758)
Catarhoe cuculata (Hufnagel, 1767)
Catarhoe rubidata (Denis & Schiffermüller, 1775)
Cepphis advenaria (Hübner, 1790)
Chesias legatella (Denis & Schiffermüller, 1775)
Chesias rufata (Fabricius, 1775)
Chiasmia clathrata (Linnaeus, 1758)
Chlorissa viridata (Linnaeus, 1758)
Chloroclysta miata (Linnaeus, 1758)
Chloroclysta siterata (Hufnagel, 1767)
Chloroclystis v-ata (Haworth, 1809)
Cidaria fulvata (Forster, 1771)
Cleora cinctaria (Denis & Schiffermüller, 1775)
Colostygia olivata (Denis & Schiffermüller, 1775)
Colostygia pectinataria (Knoch, 1781)
Colotois pennaria (Linnaeus, 1761)
Comibaena bajularia (Denis & Schiffermüller, 1775)
Cosmorhoe ocellata (Linnaeus, 1758)
Costaconvexa polygrammata (Borkhausen, 1794)
Crocallis elinguaria (Linnaeus, 1758)
Cyclophora linearia (Hübner, 1799)
Cyclophora punctaria (Linnaeus, 1758)
Cyclophora annularia (Fabricius, 1775)
Cyclophora pendularia (Clerck, 1759)
Cyclophora quercimontaria (Bastelberger, 1897)
Cyclophora ruficiliaria (Herrich-Schäffer, 1855)
Deileptenia ribeata (Clerck, 1759)
Dysstroma citrata (Linnaeus, 1761)
Dysstroma truncata (Hufnagel, 1767)
Earophila badiata (Denis & Schiffermüller, 1775)
Ecliptopera capitata (Herrich-Schäffer, 1839)
Ecliptopera silaceata (Denis & Schiffermüller, 1775)
Ectropis crepuscularia (Denis & Schiffermüller, 1775)
Electrophaes corylata (Thunberg, 1792)
Ematurga atomaria (Linnaeus, 1758)
Ennomos alniaria (Linnaeus, 1758)
Ennomos autumnaria (Werneburg, 1859)
Ennomos erosaria (Denis & Schiffermüller, 1775)
Ennomos fuscantaria (Haworth, 1809)
Ennomos quercinaria (Hufnagel, 1767)
Epirranthis diversata (Denis & Schiffermüller, 1775)
Epirrhoe alternata (Muller, 1764)
Epirrhoe galiata (Denis & Schiffermüller, 1775)
Epirrhoe hastulata (Hübner, 1790)
Epirrhoe molluginata (Hübner, 1813)
Epirrhoe rivata (Hübner, 1813)
Epirrhoe tristata (Linnaeus, 1758)
Epirrita autumnata (Borkhausen, 1794)
Epirrita christyi (Allen, 1906)
Epirrita dilutata (Denis & Schiffermüller, 1775)
Erannis defoliaria (Clerck, 1759)
Eulithis mellinata (Fabricius, 1787)
Eulithis populata (Linnaeus, 1758)
Eulithis prunata (Linnaeus, 1758)
Eulithis testata (Linnaeus, 1761)
Euphyia biangulata (Haworth, 1809)
Euphyia frustata (Treitschke, 1828)
Euphyia unangulata (Haworth, 1809)
Eupithecia abbreviata Stephens, 1831
Eupithecia abietaria (Goeze, 1781)
Eupithecia absinthiata (Clerck, 1759)
Eupithecia actaeata Walderdorff, 1869
Eupithecia analoga Djakonov, 1926
Eupithecia assimilata Doubleday, 1856
Eupithecia centaureata (Denis & Schiffermüller, 1775)
Eupithecia denotata (Hübner, 1813)
Eupithecia distinctaria Herrich-Schäffer, 1848
Eupithecia dodoneata Guenee, 1858
Eupithecia exiguata (Hübner, 1813)
Eupithecia expallidata Doubleday, 1856
Eupithecia extraversaria Herrich-Schäffer, 1852
Eupithecia haworthiata Doubleday, 1856
Eupithecia icterata (de Villers, 1789)
Eupithecia impurata (Hübner, 1813)
Eupithecia indigata (Hübner, 1813)
Eupithecia innotata (Hufnagel, 1767)
Eupithecia insigniata (Hübner, 1790)
Eupithecia intricata (Zetterstedt, 1839)
Eupithecia inturbata (Hübner, 1817)
Eupithecia irriguata (Hübner, 1813)
Eupithecia lanceata (Hübner, 1825)
Eupithecia lariciata (Freyer, 1841)
Eupithecia linariata (Denis & Schiffermüller, 1775)
Eupithecia millefoliata Rossler, 1866
Eupithecia nanata (Hübner, 1813)
Eupithecia pimpinellata (Hübner, 1813)
Eupithecia plumbeolata (Haworth, 1809)
Eupithecia satyrata (Hübner, 1813)
Eupithecia subfuscata (Haworth, 1809)
Eupithecia subumbrata (Denis & Schiffermüller, 1775)
Eupithecia succenturiata (Linnaeus, 1758)
Eupithecia tantillaria Boisduval, 1840
Eupithecia tenuiata (Hübner, 1813)
Eupithecia tripunctaria Herrich-Schäffer, 1852
Eupithecia trisignaria Herrich-Schäffer, 1848
Eupithecia valerianata (Hübner, 1813)
Eupithecia venosata (Fabricius, 1787)
Eupithecia virgaureata Doubleday, 1861
Eupithecia vulgata (Haworth, 1809)
Eustroma reticulata (Denis & Schiffermüller, 1775)
Gandaritis pyraliata (Denis & Schiffermüller, 1775)
Geometra papilionaria (Linnaeus, 1758)
Gnophos obfuscata (Denis & Schiffermüller, 1775)
Gymnoscelis rufifasciata (Haworth, 1809)
Hemithea aestivaria (Hübner, 1789)
Horisme tersata (Denis & Schiffermüller, 1775)
Horisme vitalbata (Denis & Schiffermüller, 1775)
Hydrelia flammeolaria (Hufnagel, 1767)
Hydria cervinalis (Scopoli, 1763)
Hydria undulata (Linnaeus, 1758)
Hydriomena furcata (Thunberg, 1784)
Hylaea fasciaria (Linnaeus, 1758)
Hypomecis punctinalis (Scopoli, 1763)
Hypomecis roboraria (Denis & Schiffermüller, 1775)
Idaea aureolaria (Denis & Schiffermüller, 1775)
Idaea aversata (Linnaeus, 1758)
Idaea biselata (Hufnagel, 1767)
Idaea deversaria (Herrich-Schäffer, 1847)
Idaea dilutaria (Hübner, 1799)
Idaea dimidiata (Hufnagel, 1767)
Idaea emarginata (Linnaeus, 1758)
Idaea fuscovenosa (Goeze, 1781)
Idaea humiliata (Hufnagel, 1767)
Idaea inquinata (Scopoli, 1763)
Idaea muricata (Hufnagel, 1767)
Idaea pallidata (Denis & Schiffermüller, 1775)
Idaea seriata (Schrank, 1802)
Idaea serpentata (Hufnagel, 1767)
Idaea straminata (Borkhausen, 1794)
Isturgia limbaria (Fabricius, 1775)
Jodis lactearia (Linnaeus, 1758)
Jodis putata (Linnaeus, 1758)
Lampropteryx suffumata (Denis & Schiffermüller, 1775)
Larentia clavaria (Haworth, 1809)
Ligdia adustata (Denis & Schiffermüller, 1775)
Lobophora halterata (Hufnagel, 1767)
Lomaspilis marginata (Linnaeus, 1758)
Lomographa bimaculata (Fabricius, 1775)
Lomographa temerata (Denis & Schiffermüller, 1775)
Lycia hirtaria (Clerck, 1759)
Lycia zonaria (Denis & Schiffermüller, 1775)
Lythria purpuraria (Linnaeus, 1758)
Macaria alternata (Denis & Schiffermüller, 1775)
Macaria liturata (Clerck, 1759)
Macaria notata (Linnaeus, 1758)
Macaria signaria (Hübner, 1809)
Macaria wauaria (Linnaeus, 1758)
Melanthia procellata (Denis & Schiffermüller, 1775)
Mesoleuca albicillata (Linnaeus, 1758)
Minoa murinata (Scopoli, 1763)
Nebula nebulata (Treitschke, 1828)
Nothocasis sertata (Hübner, 1817)
Nycterosea obstipata (Fabricius, 1794)
Odezia atrata (Linnaeus, 1758)
Odontopera bidentata (Clerck, 1759)
Operophtera brumata (Linnaeus, 1758)
Operophtera fagata (Scharfenberg, 1805)
Opisthograptis luteolata (Linnaeus, 1758)
Orthonama vittata (Borkhausen, 1794)
Ourapteryx sambucaria (Linnaeus, 1758)
Pachycnemia hippocastanaria (Hübner, 1799)
Paradarisa consonaria (Hübner, 1799)
Pareulype berberata (Denis & Schiffermüller, 1775)
Pasiphila chloerata (Mabille, 1870)
Pasiphila debiliata (Hübner, 1817)
Pasiphila rectangulata (Linnaeus, 1758)
Pelurga comitata (Linnaeus, 1758)
Perconia strigillaria (Hübner, 1787)
Peribatodes rhomboidaria (Denis & Schiffermüller, 1775)
Peribatodes secundaria (Denis & Schiffermüller, 1775)
Perizoma affinitata (Stephens, 1831)
Perizoma albulata (Denis & Schiffermüller, 1775)
Perizoma alchemillata (Linnaeus, 1758)
Perizoma bifaciata (Haworth, 1809)
Perizoma blandiata (Denis & Schiffermüller, 1775)
Perizoma flavofasciata (Thunberg, 1792)
Perizoma hydrata (Treitschke, 1829)
Petrophora chlorosata (Scopoli, 1763)
Phibalapteryx virgata (Hufnagel, 1767)
Phigalia pilosaria (Denis & Schiffermüller, 1775)
Philereme transversata (Hufnagel, 1767)
Philereme vetulata (Denis & Schiffermüller, 1775)
Plagodis dolabraria (Linnaeus, 1767)
Plagodis pulveraria (Linnaeus, 1758)
Plemyria rubiginata (Denis & Schiffermüller, 1775)
Pseudopanthera macularia (Linnaeus, 1758)
Pseudoterpna pruinata (Hufnagel, 1767)
Pterapherapteryx sexalata (Retzius, 1783)
Pungeleria capreolaria (Denis & Schiffermüller, 1775)
Rheumaptera hastata (Linnaeus, 1758)
Rhodometra sacraria (Linnaeus, 1767)
Rhodostrophia vibicaria (Clerck, 1759)
Scopula floslactata (Haworth, 1809)
Scopula immutata (Linnaeus, 1758)
Scopula incanata (Linnaeus, 1758)
Scopula marginepunctata (Goeze, 1781)
Scopula immorata (Linnaeus, 1758)
Scopula nigropunctata (Hufnagel, 1767)
Scopula ornata (Scopoli, 1763)
Scopula rubiginata (Hufnagel, 1767)
Scopula tessellaria (Boisduval, 1840)
Scopula umbelaria (Hübner, 1813)
Scotopteryx bipunctaria (Denis & Schiffermüller, 1775)
Scotopteryx chenopodiata (Linnaeus, 1758)
Scotopteryx moeniata (Scopoli, 1763)
Scotopteryx mucronata (Scopoli, 1763)
Selenia dentaria (Fabricius, 1775)
Selenia lunularia (Hübner, 1788)
Selenia tetralunaria (Hufnagel, 1767)
Siona lineata (Scopoli, 1763)
Spargania luctuata (Denis & Schiffermüller, 1775)
Tephronia sepiaria (Hufnagel, 1767)
Thalera fimbrialis (Scopoli, 1763)
Thera britannica (Turner, 1925)
Thera juniperata (Linnaeus, 1758)
Thera obeliscata (Hübner, 1787)
Thera variata (Denis & Schiffermüller, 1775)
Thera vetustata (Denis & Schiffermüller, 1775)
Theria rupicapraria (Denis & Schiffermüller, 1775)
Thetidia smaragdaria (Fabricius, 1787)
Timandra comae Schmidt, 1931
Trichopteryx carpinata (Borkhausen, 1794)
Trichopteryx polycommata (Denis & Schiffermüller, 1775)
Triphosa dubitata (Linnaeus, 1758)
Venusia cambrica Curtis, 1839
Xanthorhoe biriviata (Borkhausen, 1794)
Xanthorhoe designata (Hufnagel, 1767)
Xanthorhoe ferrugata (Clerck, 1759)
Xanthorhoe fluctuata (Linnaeus, 1758)
Xanthorhoe montanata (Denis & Schiffermüller, 1775)
Xanthorhoe quadrifasiata (Clerck, 1759)
Xanthorhoe spadicearia (Denis & Schiffermüller, 1775)

Glyphipterigidae
Acrolepiopsis assectella (Zeller, 1839)
Glyphipterix bergstraesserella (Fabricius, 1781)
Glyphipterix equitella (Scopoli, 1763)
Glyphipterix forsterella (Fabricius, 1781)
Glyphipterix haworthana (Stephens, 1834)
Glyphipterix simpliciella (Stephens, 1834)
Glyphipterix thrasonella (Scopoli, 1763)

Gracillariidae
Acrocercops brongniardella (Fabricius, 1798)
Callisto denticulella (Thunberg, 1794)
Caloptilia alchimiella (Scopoli, 1763)
Caloptilia azaleella (Brants, 1913)
Caloptilia elongella (Linnaeus, 1761)
Caloptilia falconipennella (Hübner, 1813)
Caloptilia hemidactylella (Denis & Schiffermüller, 1775)
Caloptilia populetorum (Zeller, 1839)
Caloptilia robustella Jackh, 1972
Caloptilia stigmatella (Fabricius, 1781)
Cameraria ohridella Deschka & Dimic, 1986
Dialectica imperialella (Zeller, 1847)
Euspilapteryx auroguttella Stephens, 1835
Gracillaria syringella (Fabricius, 1794)
Parornix anglicella (Stainton, 1850)
Parornix devoniella (Stainton, 1850)
Parornix finitimella (Zeller, 1850)
Phyllocnistis labyrinthella (Bjerkander, 1790)
Phyllocnistis unipunctella (Stephens, 1834)
Phyllonorycter blancardella (Fabricius, 1781)
Phyllonorycter cerasicolella (Herrich-Schäffer, 1855)
Phyllonorycter comparella (Duponchel, 1843)
Phyllonorycter corylifoliella (Hübner, 1796)
Phyllonorycter esperella (Goeze, 1783)
Phyllonorycter harrisella (Linnaeus, 1761)
Phyllonorycter insignitella (Zeller, 1846)
Phyllonorycter klemannella (Fabricius, 1781)
Phyllonorycter lautella (Zeller, 1846)
Phyllonorycter maestingella (Muller, 1764)
Phyllonorycter muelleriella (Zeller, 1839)
Phyllonorycter nicellii (Stainton, 1851)
Phyllonorycter oxyacanthae (Frey, 1856)
Phyllonorycter quercifoliella (Zeller, 1839)
Phyllonorycter rajella (Linnaeus, 1758)
Phyllonorycter roboris (Zeller, 1839)
Phyllonorycter sagitella (Bjerkander, 1790)
Phyllonorycter salicicolella (Sircom, 1848)
Phyllonorycter salictella (Zeller, 1846)
Phyllonorycter sorbi (Frey, 1855)
Phyllonorycter spinicolella (Zeller, 1846)
Phyllonorycter tenerella (de Joannis, 1915)
Phyllonorycter trifasciella (Haworth, 1828)
Phyllonorycter tristrigella (Haworth, 1828)
Phyllonorycter ulmifoliella (Hübner, 1817)
Povolnya leucapennella (Stephens, 1835)

Hepialidae
Hepialus humuli (Linnaeus, 1758)
Pharmacis lupulina (Linnaeus, 1758)
Phymatopus hecta (Linnaeus, 1758)
Triodia sylvina (Linnaeus, 1761)

Incurvariidae
Incurvaria praelatella (Denis & Schiffermüller, 1775)

Lasiocampidae
Cosmotriche lobulina (Denis & Schiffermüller, 1775)
Dendrolimus pini (Linnaeus, 1758)
Eriogaster catax (Linnaeus, 1758)
Eriogaster lanestris (Linnaeus, 1758)
Euthrix potatoria (Linnaeus, 1758)
Gastropacha quercifolia (Linnaeus, 1758)
Gastropacha populifolia (Denis & Schiffermüller, 1775)
Lasiocampa quercus (Linnaeus, 1758)
Lasiocampa trifolii (Denis & Schiffermüller, 1775)
Macrothylacia rubi (Linnaeus, 1758)
Malacosoma castrensis (Linnaeus, 1758)
Malacosoma neustria (Linnaeus, 1758)
Odonestis pruni (Linnaeus, 1758)
Phyllodesma ilicifolia (Linnaeus, 1758)
Phyllodesma tremulifolia (Hübner, 1810)
Poecilocampa populi (Linnaeus, 1758)
Trichiura crataegi (Linnaeus, 1758)

Lecithoceridae
Odites ternatella (Staudinger, 1859)

Lyonetiidae
Leucoptera laburnella (Stainton, 1851)
Leucoptera malifoliella (O. Costa, 1836)
Leucoptera spartifoliella (Hübner, 1813)
Lyonetia clerkella (Linnaeus, 1758)

Lypusidae
Pseudatemelia flavifrontella (Denis & Schiffermüller, 1775)
Pseudatemelia latipennella (Jackh, 1959)
Pseudatemelia josephinae (Toll, 1956)

Micropterigidae
Micropterix aruncella (Scopoli, 1763)
Micropterix calthella (Linnaeus, 1761)

Momphidae
Mompha idaei (Zeller, 1839)
Mompha conturbatella (Hübner, 1819)
Mompha divisella Herrich-Schäffer, 1854
Mompha epilobiella (Denis & Schiffermüller, 1775)
Mompha propinquella (Stainton, 1851)
Mompha sturnipennella (Treitschke, 1833)
Mompha subbistrigella (Haworth, 1828)
Mompha raschkiella (Zeller, 1839)

Nepticulidae
Ectoedemia subbimaculella (Haworth, 1828)
Stigmella anomalella (Goeze, 1783)
Stigmella aurella (Fabricius, 1775)
Stigmella centifoliella (Zeller, 1848)
Stigmella incognitella (Herrich-Schäffer, 1855)
Stigmella malella (Stainton, 1854)
Stigmella minusculella (Herrich-Schäffer, 1855)
Stigmella prunetorum (Stainton, 1855)
Stigmella pyri (Glitz, 1865)
Stigmella splendidissimella (Herrich-Schäffer, 1855)

Noctuidae
Abrostola tripartita (Hufnagel, 1766)
Abrostola triplasia (Linnaeus, 1758)
Acontia trabealis (Scopoli, 1763)
Acronicta aceris (Linnaeus, 1758)
Acronicta leporina (Linnaeus, 1758)
Acronicta strigosa (Denis & Schiffermüller, 1775)
Acronicta alni (Linnaeus, 1767)
Acronicta psi (Linnaeus, 1758)
Acronicta tridens (Denis & Schiffermüller, 1775)
Acronicta auricoma (Denis & Schiffermüller, 1775)
Acronicta euphorbiae (Denis & Schiffermüller, 1775)
Acronicta rumicis (Linnaeus, 1758)
Actinotia polyodon (Clerck, 1759)
Agrochola lychnidis (Denis & Schiffermüller, 1775)
Agrochola helvola (Linnaeus, 1758)
Agrochola litura (Linnaeus, 1758)
Agrochola lunosa (Haworth, 1809)
Agrochola lota (Clerck, 1759)
Agrochola macilenta (Hübner, 1809)
Agrochola circellaris (Hufnagel, 1766)
Agrotis clavis (Hufnagel, 1766)
Agrotis exclamationis (Linnaeus, 1758)
Agrotis ipsilon (Hufnagel, 1766)
Agrotis segetum (Denis & Schiffermüller, 1775)
Agrotis vestigialis (Hufnagel, 1766)
Allophyes oxyacanthae (Linnaeus, 1758)
Amphipoea fucosa (Freyer, 1830)
Amphipoea oculea (Linnaeus, 1761)
Amphipyra berbera Rungs, 1949
Amphipyra perflua (Fabricius, 1787)
Amphipyra pyramidea (Linnaeus, 1758)
Amphipyra tragopoginis (Clerck, 1759)
Anaplectoides prasina (Denis & Schiffermüller, 1775)
Anarta myrtilli (Linnaeus, 1761)
Anarta odontites (Boisduval, 1829)
Anarta trifolii (Hufnagel, 1766)
Anorthoa munda (Denis & Schiffermüller, 1775)
Antitype chi (Linnaeus, 1758)
Apamea anceps (Denis & Schiffermüller, 1775)
Apamea crenata (Hufnagel, 1766)
Apamea illyria Freyer, 1846
Apamea lateritia (Hufnagel, 1766)
Apamea lithoxylaea (Denis & Schiffermüller, 1775)
Apamea monoglypha (Hufnagel, 1766)
Apamea remissa (Hübner, 1809)
Apamea scolopacina (Esper, 1788)
Apamea sordens (Hufnagel, 1766)
Apamea sublustris (Esper, 1788)
Apamea unanimis (Hübner, 1813)
Aporophyla lueneburgensis (Freyer, 1848)
Apterogenum ypsillon (Denis & Schiffermüller, 1775)
Asteroscopus sphinx (Hufnagel, 1766)
Atethmia centrago (Haworth, 1809)
Autographa bractea (Denis & Schiffermüller, 1775)
Autographa gamma (Linnaeus, 1758)
Autographa jota (Linnaeus, 1758)
Autographa pulchrina (Haworth, 1809)
Axylia putris (Linnaeus, 1761)
Brachionycha nubeculosa (Esper, 1785)
Brachylomia viminalis (Fabricius, 1776)
Bryophila raptricula (Denis & Schiffermüller, 1775)
Bryophila domestica (Hufnagel, 1766)
Calamia tridens (Hufnagel, 1766)
Callopistria juventina (Stoll, 1782)
Calophasia lunula (Hufnagel, 1766)
Caradrina morpheus (Hufnagel, 1766)
Caradrina clavipalpis Scopoli, 1763
Ceramica pisi (Linnaeus, 1758)
Cerapteryx graminis (Linnaeus, 1758)
Cerastis leucographa (Denis & Schiffermüller, 1775)
Cerastis rubricosa (Denis & Schiffermüller, 1775)
Charanyca trigrammica (Hufnagel, 1766)
Charanyca ferruginea (Esper, 1785)
Chersotis margaritacea (Villers, 1789)
Chersotis multangula (Hübner, 1803)
Chloantha hyperici (Denis & Schiffermüller, 1775)
Colocasia coryli (Linnaeus, 1758)
Conistra ligula (Esper, 1791)
Conistra rubiginosa (Scopoli, 1763)
Conistra vaccinii (Linnaeus, 1761)
Conistra rubiginea (Denis & Schiffermüller, 1775)
Cosmia trapezina (Linnaeus, 1758)
Cosmia diffinis (Linnaeus, 1767)
Cosmia pyralina (Denis & Schiffermüller, 1775)
Cosmia affinis (Linnaeus, 1767)
Craniophora ligustri (Denis & Schiffermüller, 1775)
Cryphia algae (Fabricius, 1775)
Crypsedra gemmea (Treitschke, 1825)
Cucullia absinthii (Linnaeus, 1761)
Cucullia asteris (Denis & Schiffermüller, 1775)
Cucullia lactucae (Denis & Schiffermüller, 1775)
Cucullia umbratica (Linnaeus, 1758)
Cucullia scrophulariae (Denis & Schiffermüller, 1775)
Cucullia verbasci (Linnaeus, 1758)
Deltote deceptoria (Scopoli, 1763)
Deltote uncula (Clerck, 1759)
Deltote pygarga (Hufnagel, 1766)
Denticucullus pygmina (Haworth, 1809)
Diachrysia chrysitis (Linnaeus, 1758)
Diachrysia chryson (Esper, 1789)
Diarsia brunnea (Denis & Schiffermüller, 1775)
Diarsia mendica (Fabricius, 1775)
Diarsia rubi (Vieweg, 1790)
Dicycla oo (Linnaeus, 1758)
Diloba caeruleocephala (Linnaeus, 1758)
Dryobotodes eremita (Fabricius, 1775)
Dypterygia scabriuscula (Linnaeus, 1758)
Egira conspicillaris (Linnaeus, 1758)
Elaphria venustula (Hübner, 1790)
Enargia paleacea (Esper, 1788)
Epilecta linogrisea (Denis & Schiffermüller, 1775)
Eremobia ochroleuca (Denis & Schiffermüller, 1775)
Eugnorisma glareosa (Esper, 1788)
Eugraphe sigma (Denis & Schiffermüller, 1775)
Euplexia lucipara (Linnaeus, 1758)
Eupsilia transversa (Hufnagel, 1766)
Eurois occulta (Linnaeus, 1758)
Euxoa nigricans (Linnaeus, 1761)
Euxoa nigrofusca (Esper, 1788)
Euxoa obelisca (Denis & Schiffermüller, 1775)
Euxoa tritici (Linnaeus, 1761)
Globia algae (Esper, 1789)
Gortyna flavago (Denis & Schiffermüller, 1775)
Graphiphora augur (Fabricius, 1775)
Griposia aprilina (Linnaeus, 1758)
Hada plebeja (Linnaeus, 1761)
Hadena perplexa (Denis & Schiffermüller, 1775)
Hadena capsincola (Denis & Schiffermüller, 1775)
Hadena compta (Denis & Schiffermüller, 1775)
Hadena confusa (Hufnagel, 1766)
Hecatera bicolorata (Hufnagel, 1766)
Hecatera dysodea (Denis & Schiffermüller, 1775)
Heliothis viriplaca (Hufnagel, 1766)
Hoplodrina ambigua (Denis & Schiffermüller, 1775)
Hoplodrina blanda (Denis & Schiffermüller, 1775)
Hoplodrina octogenaria (Goeze, 1781)
Hoplodrina respersa (Denis & Schiffermüller, 1775)
Hoplodrina superstes (Ochsenheimer, 1816)
Hydraecia micacea (Esper, 1789)
Hydraecia petasitis Doubleday, 1847
Hyppa rectilinea (Esper, 1788)
Ipimorpha retusa (Linnaeus, 1761)
Ipimorpha subtusa (Denis & Schiffermüller, 1775)
Jodia croceago (Denis & Schiffermüller, 1775)
Lacanobia contigua (Denis & Schiffermüller, 1775)
Lacanobia suasa (Denis & Schiffermüller, 1775)
Lacanobia thalassina (Hufnagel, 1766)
Lacanobia aliena (Hübner, 1809)
Lacanobia oleracea (Linnaeus, 1758)
Lacanobia splendens (Hübner, 1808)
Lacanobia w-latinum (Hufnagel, 1766)
Lasionycta imbecilla (Fabricius, 1794)
Lateroligia ophiogramma (Esper, 1794)
Lenisa geminipuncta (Haworth, 1809)
Leucania comma (Linnaeus, 1761)
Leucania obsoleta (Hübner, 1803)
Lithophane furcifera (Hufnagel, 1766)
Lithophane ornitopus (Hufnagel, 1766)
Lithophane semibrunnea (Haworth, 1809)
Lithophane socia (Hufnagel, 1766)
Luperina testacea (Denis & Schiffermüller, 1775)
Lycophotia porphyrea (Denis & Schiffermüller, 1775)
Macdunnoughia confusa (Stephens, 1850)
Mamestra brassicae (Linnaeus, 1758)
Melanchra persicariae (Linnaeus, 1761)
Mesapamea secalella Remm, 1983
Mesapamea secalis (Linnaeus, 1758)
Mesoligia furuncula (Denis & Schiffermüller, 1775)
Mniotype adusta (Esper, 1790)
Mniotype satura (Denis & Schiffermüller, 1775)
Moma alpium (Osbeck, 1778)
Mormo maura (Linnaeus, 1758)
Mythimna albipuncta (Denis & Schiffermüller, 1775)
Mythimna ferrago (Fabricius, 1787)
Mythimna l-album (Linnaeus, 1767)
Mythimna conigera (Denis & Schiffermüller, 1775)
Mythimna impura (Hübner, 1808)
Mythimna pallens (Linnaeus, 1758)
Mythimna pudorina (Denis & Schiffermüller, 1775)
Mythimna vitellina (Hübner, 1808)
Mythimna unipuncta (Haworth, 1809)
Naenia typica (Linnaeus, 1758)
Noctua comes Hübner, 1813
Noctua fimbriata (Schreber, 1759)
Noctua interjecta Hübner, 1803
Noctua janthe (Borkhausen, 1792)
Noctua janthina Denis & Schiffermüller, 1775
Noctua orbona (Hufnagel, 1766)
Noctua pronuba (Linnaeus, 1758)
Nonagria typhae (Thunberg, 1784)
Nyctobrya muralis (Forster, 1771)
Ochropleura plecta (Linnaeus, 1761)
Oligia fasciuncula (Haworth, 1809)
Oligia latruncula (Denis & Schiffermüller, 1775)
Oligia strigilis (Linnaeus, 1758)
Oligia versicolor (Borkhausen, 1792)
Orthosia gracilis (Denis & Schiffermüller, 1775)
Orthosia opima (Hübner, 1809)
Orthosia cerasi (Fabricius, 1775)
Orthosia cruda (Denis & Schiffermüller, 1775)
Orthosia miniosa (Denis & Schiffermüller, 1775)
Orthosia populeti (Fabricius, 1775)
Orthosia incerta (Hufnagel, 1766)
Orthosia gothica (Linnaeus, 1758)
Pachetra sagittigera (Hufnagel, 1766)
Panchrysia aurea (Hübner, 1803)
Panchrysia v-argenteum (Esper, 1798)
Panemeria tenebrata (Scopoli, 1763)
Panolis flammea (Denis & Schiffermüller, 1775)
Panthea coenobita (Esper, 1785)
Parastichtis suspecta (Hübner, 1817)
Peridroma saucia (Hübner, 1808)
Phlogophora meticulosa (Linnaeus, 1758)
Photedes minima (Haworth, 1809)
Plusia festucae (Linnaeus, 1758)
Polia bombycina (Hufnagel, 1766)
Polia nebulosa (Hufnagel, 1766)
Polymixis flavicincta (Denis & Schiffermüller, 1775)
Pyrrhia umbra (Hufnagel, 1766)
Rhizedra lutosa (Hübner, 1803)
Rhyacia lucipeta (Denis & Schiffermüller, 1775)
Rhyacia simulans (Hufnagel, 1766)
Sedina buettneri (E. Hering, 1858)
Sideridis rivularis (Fabricius, 1775)
Sideridis reticulata (Goeze, 1781)
Sideridis turbida (Esper, 1790)
Simyra albovenosa (Goeze, 1781)
Subacronicta megacephala (Denis & Schiffermüller, 1775)
Thalpophila matura (Hufnagel, 1766)
Tholera cespitis (Denis & Schiffermüller, 1775)
Tholera decimalis (Poda, 1761)
Tiliacea aurago (Denis & Schiffermüller, 1775)
Tiliacea citrago (Linnaeus, 1758)
Trachea atriplicis (Linnaeus, 1758)
Tyta luctuosa (Denis & Schiffermüller, 1775)
Xanthia gilvago (Denis & Schiffermüller, 1775)
Xanthia icteritia (Hufnagel, 1766)
Xanthia ocellaris (Borkhausen, 1792)
Xanthia ruticilla (Esper, 1791)
Xanthia togata (Esper, 1788)
Xestia c-nigrum (Linnaeus, 1758)
Xestia ditrapezium (Denis & Schiffermüller, 1775)
Xestia triangulum (Hufnagel, 1766)
Xestia baja (Denis & Schiffermüller, 1775)
Xestia sexstrigata (Haworth, 1809)
Xestia xanthographa (Denis & Schiffermüller, 1775)
Xylena solidaginis (Hübner, 1803)
Xylena vetusta (Hübner, 1813)
Xylocampa areola (Esper, 1789)

Nolidae
Bena bicolorana (Fuessly, 1775)
Earias vernana (Fabricius, 1787)
Meganola albula (Denis & Schiffermüller, 1775)
Nola confusalis (Herrich-Schäffer, 1847)
Nola cucullatella (Linnaeus, 1758)
Nycteola revayana (Scopoli, 1772)
Pseudoips prasinana (Linnaeus, 1758)

Notodontidae
Cerura erminea (Esper, 1783)
Cerura vinula (Linnaeus, 1758)
Clostera anachoreta (Denis & Schiffermüller, 1775)
Clostera anastomosis (Linnaeus, 1758)
Clostera curtula (Linnaeus, 1758)
Clostera pigra (Hufnagel, 1766)
Dicranura ulmi (Denis & Schiffermüller, 1775)
Drymonia dodonaea (Denis & Schiffermüller, 1775)
Drymonia obliterata (Esper, 1785)
Drymonia querna (Denis & Schiffermüller, 1775)
Drymonia ruficornis (Hufnagel, 1766)
Drymonia velitaris (Hufnagel, 1766)
Furcula bicuspis (Borkhausen, 1790)
Furcula bifida (Brahm, 1787)
Furcula furcula (Clerck, 1759)
Gluphisia crenata (Esper, 1785)
Harpyia milhauseri (Fabricius, 1775)
Leucodonta bicoloria (Denis & Schiffermüller, 1775)
Notodonta dromedarius (Linnaeus, 1767)
Notodonta torva (Hübner, 1803)
Notodonta tritophus (Denis & Schiffermüller, 1775)
Notodonta ziczac (Linnaeus, 1758)
Odontosia carmelita (Esper, 1799)
Peridea anceps (Goeze, 1781)
Phalera bucephala (Linnaeus, 1758)
Pheosia gnoma (Fabricius, 1776)
Pheosia tremula (Clerck, 1759)
Pterostoma palpina (Clerck, 1759)
Ptilodon capucina (Linnaeus, 1758)
Ptilodon cucullina (Denis & Schiffermüller, 1775)
Ptilophora plumigera (Denis & Schiffermüller, 1775)
Stauropus fagi (Linnaeus, 1758)
Thaumetopoea processionea (Linnaeus, 1758)

Oecophoridae
Alabonia geoffrella (Linnaeus, 1767)
Batia lambdella (Donovan, 1793)
Bisigna procerella (Denis & Schiffermüller, 1775)
Borkhausenia luridicomella (Herrich-Schäffer, 1856)
Borkhausenia minutella (Linnaeus, 1758)
Carcina quercana (Fabricius, 1775)
Crassa unitella (Hübner, 1796)
Denisia stipella (Linnaeus, 1758)
Endrosis sarcitrella (Linnaeus, 1758)
Harpella forficella (Scopoli, 1763)
Hofmannophila pseudospretella (Stainton, 1849)
Oecophora bractella (Linnaeus, 1758)
Pleurota bicostella (Clerck, 1759)

Plutellidae
Eidophasia messingiella (Fischer von Röslerstamm, 1840)
Plutella xylostella (Linnaeus, 1758)
Plutella porrectella (Linnaeus, 1758)

Praydidae
Prays fraxinella (Bjerkander, 1784)

Prodoxidae
Lampronia capitella (Clerck, 1759)

Psychidae
Apterona helicoidella (Vallot, 1827)
Canephora hirsuta (Poda, 1761)
Dahlica sauteri (Hattenschwiler, 1977)
Dahlica triquetrella (Hübner, 1813)
Diplodoma laichartingella Goeze, 1783
Epichnopterix plumella (Denis & Schiffermüller, 1775)
Luffia ferchaultella (Stephens, 1850)
Narycia duplicella (Goeze, 1783)
Proutia betulina (Zeller, 1839)
Psyche casta (Pallas, 1767)
Sterrhopterix fusca (Haworth, 1809)
Taleporia tubulosa (Retzius, 1783)

Pterophoridae
Adaina microdactyla (Hübner, 1813)
Amblyptilia acanthadactyla (Hübner, 1813)
Capperia britanniodactylus (Gregson, 1867)
Capperia fusca (O. Hofmann, 1898)
Cnaemidophorus rhododactyla (Denis & Schiffermüller, 1775)
Emmelina monodactyla (Linnaeus, 1758)
Gillmeria ochrodactyla (Denis & Schiffermüller, 1775)
Gillmeria pallidactyla (Haworth, 1811)
Hellinsia carphodactyla (Hübner, 1813)
Hellinsia didactylites (Strom, 1783)
Hellinsia osteodactylus (Zeller, 1841)
Marasmarcha lunaedactyla (Haworth, 1811)
Merrifieldia baliodactylus (Zeller, 1841)
Merrifieldia leucodactyla (Denis & Schiffermüller, 1775)
Oidaematophorus lithodactyla (Treitschke, 1833)
Oxyptilus chrysodactyla (Denis & Schiffermüller, 1775)
Oxyptilus parvidactyla (Haworth, 1811)
Oxyptilus pilosellae (Zeller, 1841)
Platyptilia gonodactyla (Denis & Schiffermüller, 1775)
Platyptilia nemoralis Zeller, 1841
Pselnophorus heterodactyla (Muller, 1764)
Pterophorus pentadactyla (Linnaeus, 1758)
Stenoptilia bipunctidactyla (Scopoli, 1763)
Stenoptilia pelidnodactyla (Stein, 1837)
Stenoptilia pterodactyla (Linnaeus, 1761)
Stenoptilia zophodactylus (Duponchel, 1840)
Wheeleria spilodactylus (Curtis, 1827)

Pyralidae
Achroia grisella (Fabricius, 1794)
Acrobasis advenella (Zincken, 1818)
Acrobasis consociella (Hübner, 1813)
Acrobasis marmorea (Haworth, 1811)
Acrobasis repandana (Fabricius, 1798)
Acrobasis suavella (Zincken, 1818)
Aglossa caprealis (Hübner, 1809)
Aglossa pinguinalis (Linnaeus, 1758)
Ancylosis cinnamomella (Duponchel, 1836)
Aphomia sociella (Linnaeus, 1758)
Aphomia zelleri de Joannis, 1932
Apomyelois ceratoniae (Zeller, 1839)
Assara terebrella (Zincken, 1818)
Delplanqueia dilutella (Denis & Schiffermüller, 1775)
Dioryctria abietella (Denis & Schiffermüller, 1775)
Dioryctria schuetzeella Fuchs, 1899
Dioryctria simplicella Heinemann, 1863
Eccopisa effractella Zeller, 1848
Elegia similella (Zincken, 1818)
Endotricha flammealis (Denis & Schiffermüller, 1775)
Ephestia elutella (Hübner, 1796)
Ephestia kuehniella Zeller, 1879
Ephestia unicolorella Staudinger, 1881
Etiella zinckenella (Treitschke, 1832)
Euzophera pinguis (Haworth, 1811)
Galleria mellonella (Linnaeus, 1758)
Gymnancyla canella (Denis & Schiffermüller, 1775)
Homoeosoma nebulella (Denis & Schiffermüller, 1775)
Homoeosoma nimbella (Duponchel, 1837)
Homoeosoma sinuella (Fabricius, 1794)
Hypochalcia ahenella (Denis & Schiffermüller, 1775)
Hypochalcia lignella (Hübner, 1796)
Hypsopygia costalis (Fabricius, 1775)
Hypsopygia glaucinalis (Linnaeus, 1758)
Matilella fusca (Haworth, 1811)
Moitrelia obductella (Zeller, 1839)
Myelois cribratella Zeller, 1847
Nephopterix angustella (Hübner, 1796)
Nyctegretis lineana (Scopoli, 1786)
Oncocera semirubella (Scopoli, 1763)
Ortholepis betulae (Goeze, 1778)
Pempeliella ornatella (Denis & Schiffermüller, 1775)
Phycita roborella (Denis & Schiffermüller, 1775)
Phycitodes albatella (Ragonot, 1887)
Phycitodes binaevella (Hübner, 1813)
Plodia interpunctella (Hübner, 1813)
Pyralis farinalis (Linnaeus, 1758)
Salebriopsis albicilla (Herrich-Schäffer, 1849)
Selagia spadicella (Hübner, 1796)
Synaphe punctalis (Fabricius, 1775)
Zophodia grossulariella (Hübner, 1809)

Roeslerstammiidae
Roeslerstammia erxlebella (Fabricius, 1787)

Saturniidae
Aglia tau (Linnaeus, 1758)
Saturnia pavonia (Linnaeus, 1758)
Saturnia pyri (Denis & Schiffermüller, 1775)

Schreckensteiniidae
Schreckensteinia festaliella (Hübner, 1819)

Scythrididae
Enolmis acanthella (Godart, 1824)
Scythris scopolella (Linnaeus, 1767)

Sesiidae
Bembecia albanensis (Rebel, 1918)
Bembecia ichneumoniformis (Denis & Schiffermüller, 1775)
Chamaesphecia empiformis (Esper, 1783)
Chamaesphecia nigrifrons (Le Cerf, 1911)
Chamaesphecia tenthrediniformis (Denis & Schiffermüller, 1775)
Paranthrene insolitus Le Cerf, 1914
Paranthrene tabaniformis (Rottemburg, 1775)
Pennisetia hylaeiformis (Laspeyres, 1801)
Pyropteron affinis (Staudinger, 1856)
Pyropteron chrysidiformis (Esper, 1782)
Sesia apiformis (Clerck, 1759)
Sesia bembeciformis (Hübner, 1806)
Sesia melanocephala Dalman, 1816
Synanthedon andrenaeformis (Laspeyres, 1801)
Synanthedon conopiformis (Esper, 1782)
Synanthedon culiciformis (Linnaeus, 1758)
Synanthedon flaviventris (Staudinger, 1883)
Synanthedon formicaeformis (Esper, 1783)
Synanthedon loranthi (Kralicek, 1966)
Synanthedon myopaeformis (Borkhausen, 1789)
Synanthedon scoliaeformis (Borkhausen, 1789)
Synanthedon spheciformis (Denis & Schiffermüller, 1775)
Synanthedon spuleri (Fuchs, 1908)
Synanthedon stomoxiformis (Hübner, 1790)
Synanthedon tipuliformis (Clerck, 1759)
Synanthedon vespiformis (Linnaeus, 1761)

Sphingidae
Acherontia atropos (Linnaeus, 1758)
Agrius convolvuli (Linnaeus, 1758)
Daphnis nerii (Linnaeus, 1758)
Deilephila elpenor (Linnaeus, 1758)
Deilephila porcellus (Linnaeus, 1758)
Hemaris fuciformis (Linnaeus, 1758)
Hemaris tityus (Linnaeus, 1758)
Hippotion celerio (Linnaeus, 1758)
Hyles euphorbiae (Linnaeus, 1758)
Hyles gallii (Rottemburg, 1775)
Hyles livornica (Esper, 1780)
Laothoe populi (Linnaeus, 1758)
Macroglossum stellatarum (Linnaeus, 1758)
Mimas tiliae (Linnaeus, 1758)
Proserpinus proserpina (Pallas, 1772)
Smerinthus ocellata (Linnaeus, 1758)
Sphinx ligustri Linnaeus, 1758
Sphinx pinastri Linnaeus, 1758

Thyrididae
Thyris fenestrella (Scopoli, 1763)

Tineidae
Agnathosia mendicella (Denis & Schiffermüller, 1775)
Eudarcia pagenstecherella (Hübner, 1825)
Euplocamus anthracinalis (Scopoli, 1763)
Infurcitinea roesslerella (Heyden, 1865)
Monopis obviella (Denis & Schiffermüller, 1775)
Monopis weaverella (Scott, 1858)
Montescardia tessulatellus (Zeller, 1846)
Nemapogon clematella (Fabricius, 1781)
Nemapogon cloacella (Haworth, 1828)
Nemapogon granella (Linnaeus, 1758)
Nemapogon wolffiella Karsholt & Nielsen, 1976
Niditinea fuscella (Linnaeus, 1758)
Niditinea striolella (Matsumura, 1931)
Tinea semifulvella Haworth, 1828
Tineola bisselliella (Hummel, 1823)
Triaxomera parasitella (Hübner, 1796)
Trichophaga tapetzella (Linnaeus, 1758)

Tischeriidae
Coptotriche marginea (Haworth, 1828)
Tischeria ekebladella (Bjerkander, 1795)

Tortricidae
Acleris aspersana (Hübner, 1817)
Acleris bergmanniana (Linnaeus, 1758)
Acleris comariana (Lienig & Zeller, 1846)
Acleris cristana (Denis & Schiffermüller, 1775)
Acleris emargana (Fabricius, 1775)
Acleris ferrugana (Denis & Schiffermüller, 1775)
Acleris forsskaleana (Linnaeus, 1758)
Acleris hastiana (Linnaeus, 1758)
Acleris holmiana (Linnaeus, 1758)
Acleris laterana (Fabricius, 1794)
Acleris literana (Linnaeus, 1758)
Acleris logiana (Clerck, 1759)
Acleris notana (Donovan, 1806)
Acleris permutana (Duponchel, 1836)
Acleris rhombana (Denis & Schiffermüller, 1775)
Acleris shepherdana (Stephens, 1852)
Acleris sparsana (Denis & Schiffermüller, 1775)
Acleris variegana (Denis & Schiffermüller, 1775)
Adoxophyes orana (Fischer v. Röslerstamm, 1834)
Aethes cnicana (Westwood, 1854)
Aethes dilucidana (Stephens, 1852)
Aethes francillana (Fabricius, 1794)
Aethes hartmanniana (Clerck, 1759)
Aethes margaritana (Haworth, 1811)
Aethes smeathmanniana (Fabricius, 1781)
Aethes tesserana (Denis & Schiffermüller, 1775)
Aethes williana (Brahm, 1791)
Agapeta hamana (Linnaeus, 1758)
Agapeta zoegana (Linnaeus, 1767)
Aleimma loeflingiana (Linnaeus, 1758)
Ancylis achatana (Denis & Schiffermüller, 1775)
Ancylis apicella (Denis & Schiffermüller, 1775)
Ancylis badiana (Denis & Schiffermüller, 1775)
Ancylis diminutana (Haworth, 1811)
Ancylis laetana (Fabricius, 1775)
Ancylis mitterbacheriana (Denis & Schiffermüller, 1775)
Ancylis myrtillana (Treitschke, 1830)
Ancylis obtusana (Haworth, 1811)
Ancylis upupana (Treitschke, 1835)
Aphelia viburniana (Denis & Schiffermüller, 1775)
Aphelia paleana (Hübner, 1793)
Apotomis betuletana (Haworth, 1811)
Apotomis capreana (Hübner, 1817)
Apotomis inundana (Denis & Schiffermüller, 1775)
Apotomis sauciana (Frolich, 1828)
Apotomis turbidana Hübner, 1825
Archips crataegana (Hübner, 1799)
Archips oporana (Linnaeus, 1758)
Archips podana (Scopoli, 1763)
Archips rosana (Linnaeus, 1758)
Archips xylosteana (Linnaeus, 1758)
Argyrotaenia ljungiana (Thunberg, 1797)
Bactra furfurana (Haworth, 1811)
Bactra lancealana (Hübner, 1799)
Capua vulgana (Frolich, 1828)
Celypha cespitana (Hübner, 1817)
Celypha lacunana (Denis & Schiffermüller, 1775)
Celypha rivulana (Scopoli, 1763)
Celypha rosaceana Schlager, 1847
Celypha rufana (Scopoli, 1763)
Celypha rurestrana (Duponchel, 1843)
Celypha siderana (Treitschke, 1835)
Celypha striana (Denis & Schiffermüller, 1775)
Celypha woodiana (Barrett, 1882)
Choristoneura hebenstreitella (Muller, 1764)
Clavigesta purdeyi (Durrant, 1911)
Clepsis consimilana (Hübner, 1817)
Clepsis senecionana (Hübner, 1819)
Clepsis spectrana (Treitschke, 1830)
Cnephasia asseclana (Denis & Schiffermüller, 1775)
Cnephasia communana (Herrich-Schäffer, 1851)
Cnephasia genitalana Pierce & Metcalfe, 1922
Cnephasia pasiuana (Hübner, 1799)
Cnephasia stephensiana (Doubleday, 1849)
Cnephasia incertana (Treitschke, 1835)
Cochylidia heydeniana (Herrich-Schäffer, 1851)
Cochylidia implicitana (Wocke, 1856)
Cochylidia rupicola (Curtis, 1834)
Cochylimorpha straminea (Haworth, 1811)
Cochylis atricapitana (Stephens, 1852)
Cochylis dubitana (Hübner, 1799)
Cochylis flaviciliana (Westwood, 1854)
Cochylis hybridella (Hübner, 1813)
Cochylis nana (Haworth, 1811)
Cochylis roseana (Haworth, 1811)
Commophila aeneana (Hübner, 1800)
Cydia conicolana (Heylaerts, 1874)
Cydia cosmophorana (Treitschke, 1835)
Cydia fagiglandana (Zeller, 1841)
Cydia illutana (Herrich-Schäffer, 1851)
Cydia microgrammana (Guenee, 1845)
Cydia nigricana (Fabricius, 1794)
Cydia pactolana (Zeller, 1840)
Cydia pomonella (Linnaeus, 1758)
Cydia servillana (Duponchel, 1836)
Cydia splendana (Hübner, 1799)
Cydia strobilella (Linnaeus, 1758)
Cydia succedana (Denis & Schiffermüller, 1775)
Cymolomia hartigiana (Saxesen, 1840)
Dichelia histrionana (Frolich, 1828)
Dichrorampha acuminatana (Lienig & Zeller, 1846)
Dichrorampha aeratana (Pierce & Metcalfe, 1915)
Dichrorampha agilana (Tengstrom, 1848)
Dichrorampha alpinana (Treitschke, 1830)
Dichrorampha flavidorsana Knaggs, 1867
Dichrorampha petiverella (Linnaeus, 1758)
Dichrorampha plumbagana (Treitschke, 1830)
Dichrorampha plumbana (Scopoli, 1763)
Dichrorampha sedatana Busck, 1906
Dichrorampha sequana (Hübner, 1799)
Dichrorampha simpliciana (Haworth, 1811)
Dichrorampha sylvicolana Heinemann, 1863
Dichrorampha vancouverana McDunnough, 1935
Ditula angustiorana (Haworth, 1811)
Eana incanana (Stephens, 1852)
Eana argentana (Clerck, 1759)
Enarmonia formosana (Scopoli, 1763)
Endothenia ericetana (Humphreys & Westwood, 1845)
Endothenia gentianaeana (Hübner, 1799)
Endothenia lapideana (Herrich-Schäffer, 1851)
Endothenia marginana (Haworth, 1811)
Endothenia nigricostana (Haworth, 1811)
Endothenia oblongana (Haworth, 1811)
Endothenia quadrimaculana (Haworth, 1811)
Endothenia ustulana (Haworth, 1811)
Epagoge grotiana (Fabricius, 1781)
Epiblema cirsiana (Zeller, 1843)
Epiblema costipunctana (Haworth, 1811)
Epiblema foenella (Linnaeus, 1758)
Epiblema graphana (Treitschke, 1835)
Epiblema hepaticana (Treitschke, 1835)
Epiblema inulivora (Meyrick, 1932)
Epiblema similana (Denis & Schiffermüller, 1775)
Epiblema sticticana (Fabricius, 1794)
Epiblema turbidana (Treitschke, 1835)
Epinotia abbreviana (Fabricius, 1794)
Epinotia bilunana (Haworth, 1811)
Epinotia brunnichana (Linnaeus, 1767)
Epinotia caprana (Fabricius, 1798)
Epinotia cruciana (Linnaeus, 1761)
Epinotia demarniana (Fischer v. Röslerstamm, 1840)
Epinotia fraternana (Haworth, 1811)
Epinotia granitana (Herrich-Schäffer, 1851)
Epinotia immundana (Fischer v. Röslerstamm, 1839)
Epinotia maculana (Fabricius, 1775)
Epinotia nanana (Treitschke, 1835)
Epinotia nisella (Clerck, 1759)
Epinotia pygmaeana (Hübner, 1799)
Epinotia ramella (Linnaeus, 1758)
Epinotia rubiginosana (Herrich-Schäffer, 1851)
Epinotia signatana (Douglas, 1845)
Epinotia solandriana (Linnaeus, 1758)
Epinotia sordidana (Hübner, 1824)
Epinotia subocellana (Donovan, 1806)
Epinotia subsequana (Haworth, 1811)
Epinotia tedella (Clerck, 1759)
Epinotia tenerana (Denis & Schiffermüller, 1775)
Epinotia tetraquetrana (Haworth, 1811)
Epinotia trigonella (Linnaeus, 1758)
Eriopsela quadrana (Hübner, 1813)
Eucosma aspidiscana (Hübner, 1817)
Eucosma campoliliana (Denis & Schiffermüller, 1775)
Eucosma cana (Haworth, 1811)
Eucosma conterminana (Guenee, 1845)
Eucosma hohenwartiana (Denis & Schiffermüller, 1775)
Eucosma metzneriana (Treitschke, 1830)
Eucosma obumbratana (Lienig & Zeller, 1846)
Eucosmomorpha albersana (Hübner, 1813)
Eudemis porphyrana (Hübner, 1799)
Eudemis profundana (Denis & Schiffermüller, 1775)
Eulia ministrana (Linnaeus, 1758)
Eupoecilia ambiguella (Hübner, 1796)
Eupoecilia angustana (Hübner, 1799)
Exapate congelatella (Clerck, 1759)
Fulvoclysia nerminae Kocak, 1982
Gibberifera simplana (Fischer v. Röslerstamm, 1836)
Grapholita funebrana Treitschke, 1835
Grapholita janthinana (Duponchel, 1843)
Grapholita lobarzewskii (Nowicki, 1860)
Grapholita tenebrosana Duponchel, 1843
Grapholita compositella (Fabricius, 1775)
Grapholita coronillana Lienig & Zeller, 1846
Grapholita fissana (Frolich, 1828)
Grapholita gemmiferana Treitschke, 1835
Grapholita jungiella (Clerck, 1759)
Gypsonoma aceriana (Duponchel, 1843)
Gypsonoma dealbana (Frolich, 1828)
Gypsonoma sociana (Haworth, 1811)
Hedya nubiferana (Haworth, 1811)
Hedya ochroleucana (Frolich, 1828)
Hedya pruniana (Hübner, 1799)
Hedya salicella (Linnaeus, 1758)
Isotrias rectifasciana (Haworth, 1811)
Lathronympha strigana (Fabricius, 1775)
Lobesia abscisana (Doubleday, 1849)
Lobesia littoralis (Westwood & Humphreys, 1845)
Lobesia reliquana (Hübner, 1825)
Metendothenia atropunctana (Zetterstedt, 1839)
Neosphaleroptera nubilana (Hübner, 1799)
Notocelia cynosbatella (Linnaeus, 1758)
Notocelia incarnatana (Hübner, 1800)
Notocelia roborana (Denis & Schiffermüller, 1775)
Notocelia rosaecolana (Doubleday, 1850)
Notocelia tetragonana (Stephens, 1834)
Notocelia trimaculana (Haworth, 1811)
Notocelia uddmanniana (Linnaeus, 1758)
Olethreutes arcuella (Clerck, 1759)
Olindia schumacherana (Fabricius, 1787)
Orthotaenia undulana (Denis & Schiffermüller, 1775)
Pammene argyrana (Hübner, 1799)
Pammene aurana (Fabricius, 1775)
Pammene aurita Razowski, 1991
Pammene fasciana (Linnaeus, 1761)
Pammene germmana (Hübner, 1799)
Pammene giganteana (Peyerimhoff, 1863)
Pammene obscurana (Stephens, 1834)
Pammene ochsenheimeriana (Lienig & Zeller, 1846)
Pammene populana (Fabricius, 1787)
Pammene regiana (Zeller, 1849)
Pammene rhediella (Clerck, 1759)
Pammene spiniana (Duponchel, 1843)
Pammene splendidulana (Guenee, 1845)
Pandemis cerasana (Hübner, 1786)
Pandemis cinnamomeana (Treitschke, 1830)
Pandemis corylana (Fabricius, 1794)
Pandemis dumetana (Treitschke, 1835)
Pandemis heparana (Denis & Schiffermüller, 1775)
Paramesia gnomana (Clerck, 1759)
Pelochrista caecimaculana (Hübner, 1799)
Periclepsis cinctana (Denis & Schiffermüller, 1775)
Phalonidia affinitana (Douglas, 1846)
Phalonidia curvistrigana (Stainton, 1859)
Phalonidia gilvicomana (Zeller, 1847)
Phalonidia manniana (Fischer v. Röslerstamm, 1839)
Phiaris micana (Denis & Schiffermüller, 1775)
Phiaris palustrana (Lienig & Zeller, 1846)
Phiaris schulziana (Fabricius, 1776)
Phiaris umbrosana (Freyer, 1842)
Phtheochroa inopiana (Haworth, 1811)
Phtheochroa rugosana (Hübner, 1799)
Piniphila bifasciana (Haworth, 1811)
Pseudargyrotoza conwagana (Fabricius, 1775)
Pseudococcyx turionella (Linnaeus, 1758)
Pseudohermenias abietana (Fabricius, 1787)
Pseudosciaphila branderiana (Linnaeus, 1758)
Ptycholoma lecheana (Linnaeus, 1758)
Ptycholomoides aeriferana (Herrich-Schäffer, 1851)
Retinia resinella (Linnaeus, 1758)
Rhopobota myrtillana (Humphreys & Westwood, 1845)
Rhopobota naevana (Hübner, 1817)
Rhopobota stagnana (Denis & Schiffermüller, 1775)
Rhopobota ustomaculana (Curtis, 1831)
Rhyacionia buoliana (Denis & Schiffermüller, 1775)
Rhyacionia pinicolana (Doubleday, 1849)
Rhyacionia pinivorana (Lienig & Zeller, 1846)
Selania leplastriana (Curtis, 1831)
Sparganothis pilleriana (Denis & Schiffermüller, 1775)
Spilonota laricana (Heinemann, 1863)
Spilonota ocellana (Denis & Schiffermüller, 1775)
Strophedra nitidana (Fabricius, 1794)
Strophedra weirana (Douglas, 1850)
Syndemis musculana (Hübner, 1799)
Thiodia citrana (Hübner, 1799)
Tortricodes alternella (Denis & Schiffermüller, 1775)
Tortrix viridana Linnaeus, 1758
Zeiraphera griseana (Hübner, 1799)
Zeiraphera isertana (Fabricius, 1794)
Zeiraphera ratzeburgiana (Saxesen, 1840)

Yponomeutidae
Cedestis gysseleniella Zeller, 1839
Cedestis subfasciella (Stephens, 1834)
Euhyponomeuta stannella (Thunberg, 1788)
Ocnerostoma piniariella Zeller, 1847
Parahyponomeuta egregiella (Duponchel, 1839)
Paraswammerdamia albicapitella (Scharfenberg, 1805)
Paraswammerdamia nebulella (Goeze, 1783)
Scythropia crataegella (Linnaeus, 1767)
Swammerdamia caesiella (Hübner, 1796)
Swammerdamia pyrella (Villers, 1789)
Yponomeuta cagnagella (Hübner, 1813)
Yponomeuta evonymella (Linnaeus, 1758)
Yponomeuta irrorella (Hübner, 1796)
Yponomeuta mahalebella Guenee, 1845
Yponomeuta malinellus Zeller, 1838
Yponomeuta padella (Linnaeus, 1758)
Yponomeuta plumbella (Denis & Schiffermüller, 1775)
Yponomeuta rorrella (Hübner, 1796)
Yponomeuta sedella Treitschke, 1832

Ypsolophidae
Ochsenheimeria urella Fischer von Röslerstamm, 1842
Ypsolopha dentella (Fabricius, 1775)
Ypsolopha lucella (Fabricius, 1775)
Ypsolopha nemorella (Linnaeus, 1758)
Ypsolopha parenthesella (Linnaeus, 1761)
Ypsolopha persicella (Fabricius, 1787)
Ypsolopha scabrella (Linnaeus, 1761)
Ypsolopha sequella (Clerck, 1759)
Ypsolopha sylvella (Linnaeus, 1767)
Ypsolopha ustella (Clerck, 1759)
Ypsolopha vittella (Linnaeus, 1758)

Zygaenidae
Adscita statices (Linnaeus, 1758)
Jordanita globulariae (Hübner, 1793)
Rhagades pruni (Denis & Schiffermüller, 1775)
Zygaena carniolica (Scopoli, 1763)
Zygaena purpuralis (Brunnich, 1763)
Zygaena filipendulae (Linnaeus, 1758)
Zygaena lonicerae (Scheven, 1777)
Zygaena loti (Denis & Schiffermüller, 1775)
Zygaena transalpina (Esper, 1780)
Zygaena trifolii (Esper, 1783)
Zygaena viciae (Denis & Schiffermüller, 1775)

References

External links
Fauna Europaea

Luxembourg
Luxembourg
Luxembourg
Lepidoptera
List